Roots to Riches is an autobiographical documentary concert special by Filipina singer Regine Velasquez. It originally aired on May 24, 2009, in the Philippines on GMA Network. The special follows Velasquez's early childhood beginnings as an aspiring singer competing on talent shows to the influential entertainer she is today, while providing an insight into her journey with stardom and detailing various aspects of her professional and personal life. It is interspersed with a series of flashback  portraying significant events in her life and career. The program included a compilation of interviews with key people that have been instrumental to the trajectory of her success over the course of several years.

A celebration of the singer's 39th birthday, the two-hour special is spliced with musical performances filmed at Centro Escolar University in Velasquez's hometown of Malolos, Bulacan. It was directed by Louie Ignacio and produced by Aria Productions. Raul Mitra served as the music director, with guest stars Pilita Corrales, Jose Mari Chan, Dingdong Dantes, Pops Fernandez, and Dennis Trillo, and an appearance by her former competition rival Eva Castillo.

Background
Regine Velasquez started singing at age six, and had unorthodox voice training with her father, where she was immersed neck-deep in the sea and would go through vocal runs. She credits this  method for strengthening her core and stomach muscles, and developing her lung capacity. When Velasquez was nine, her family moved to Bulacan, where she started competing in talent shows. In 1984, at fourteen, she auditioned for the reality television series Ang Bagong Kampeon and won. Her career began with a record deal with OctoArts International and the release of her single "Love Me Again" in 1986. After an appearance in the variety show The Penthouse Live!, she caught the attention of Ronnie Henares, a producer and talent manager who signed her to a management deal.

In May 2009, GMA Network announced a television special for the singer entitled Roots to Riches. It was the second birthday showcase on GMA by Velasquez, after The Best of Me in 2008. A blend of documentary and musical production, the title of the special is borrowed from the phrase rags-to-riches, a parallel of Velasquez's life and career trajectory. It depicted the singer's childhood beginnings as an amateur singer competing in various talent shows in her hometown of Bulacan through a series of biographical flashback re-enactments, camera footage, and a compilation of interviews. In it, key people that have been significant in her career were interviewed, including individuals that have supported her during the early years of competing in talent shows. "[It was] research[ed]... I mean, everyone knows my story. But not this... [a lot] of untold stories", Velasquez said about the special.

Roots to Riches featured performances from a concert filmed at Centro Escolar University in  Malolos, Bulacan, which aired on May 24, 2009. Guest musicians included Pilita Corrales, Jose Mari Chan, Dingdong Dantes, Pops Fernandez, and Dennis Trillo. It included a special appearance by Velasquez's former competition rival Eva Castillo. GMA partnered with Aria Productions to produce the program, with Mae Zambrano serving as executive producer. Louie Ignacio directed it, while Darling de Jesus was the supervising producer. Rommel Gacho served as the line producer, and Archie Riola was in charge of floor production. Bang Arespacochaga was associate producer and Wilma V. Galvante was in charge of the executive production. Raul Mitra was tapped as the musical director.

Synopsis

The special began with Velasquez narrating her early life and the inspiration behind her drive to compete in talents shows. It opens with a series of flashback dramatizations of a young Velasquez as she leaves school on foot making her way to a street vendor selling memorabilia of singer-actress Sharon Cuneta, whom she idolizes. Unable to afford the item, she leaves despondent. It also featured interviews detailing her career beginnings from her former manager Ronnie Henares, sister and current manager Cacai, and her father Gerry. The documentary includes scenes of the singer revisiting her hometown of Bulacan to reunite with individuals that have supported her when she was still competing. Among them are Susan Galvez, her grade school teacher who designed and sewed her dresses, and Ernesto Cuazon, a motorized tricycle owner who would drive Velasquez and her father between towns. In another scene, a reunion between Velasquez and her former talent show rival Eva Castillo takes place.

Velasquez performed eleven songs to an audience at the Centro Escolar University, including her Ang Bagong Kampeon piece "In Your Eyes", and her debut single "Love Me Again". She also performed several duet numbers with musicians she considered significant to her career journey, including Pops Fernandez who recommended she appear as a guest in The Penthouse Live!, where she was discovered by Henares; and Jose Mari Chan with whom Velasquez recorded her first collaboration "Please Be Careful with My Heart". Castillo made a special appearance and performed a medley of OPM songs with the singer.

Set list
Set list adapted from the special itself.
 "Follow Your Road"
 "Bakit Ako Mahihiya"
 "Saan Ako Nagkamali" / "Ako Ang Nasawi, Ako Ang Nagwagi" 
 "In Your Eyes"
 "Single Ladies (Put a Ring on It)" 
 "Love Me Again"
 "If I Were a Boy" 
 "And I Am Telling You I'm Not Going"
 "Please Be Careful with My Heart" 
 "Narito Ako"
 "Lucky"

Personnel
Credits adapted from the special itself.

Band members

Regine Velasquez – lead vocals
Raul Mitra – music director
Rome Pacana – bass guitar
Cesar Aguas – guitar
Noel Mendez – guitar 
Sonny Matias – keyboard
Ferdinand Faustino – drums 
Ulysses Avante – percussion
Sylvia Macaraeg – backing vocals
Rene Martinez – backing vocals
Babsie Molina – backing vocals

Production

 Wilma V. Galvanteexecutive in charge of production
 Mae Zambranoexecutive producer
 Darling de Jesussupervising producer
 Bang Arespacochagaassociate producer
 Archie Riolafloor producer
 Rommel Gacholine producer
 Louie Ignaciostage and television director

See also
 List of GMA Network specials aired
 Regine Velasquez on screen and stage

References

Citations

Book sources
 

Regine Velasquez
2009 television specials
GMA Network television specials